El Soberano is a Mexican luchador  enmascarado or masked professional wrestler.

Soberano, meaning sovereign, may also refer to:
 Liza Soberano (born 1998), Filipino-American actress and model
 Soberano Awards, Dominican music awards
 Venezuelan bolívar soberano, the current banknote category in Venezuela

See also
 La Soberana (or Casandra Damirón; 1919–1983), Dominican singer, dancer and folklorist
 Soberanes, a surname